Bayana Lok Sabha constituency was a Lok Sabha (parliamentary) constituency in Rajasthan state in western India till 2008. This constituency was reserved for the Scheduled caste candidates.

Assembly segments
Bayana Lok Sabha constituency comprised the following eight Vidhan Sabha segments:

Members of Parliament

1952-61:Constituency does not exist
1962: Tika Ram Paliwal, Independent
1967: Jagannath Pahadia, Indian National Congress
1971: Jagannath Pahadia, Indian National Congress
1977: Shyam Sunder Lal, Janata Party
1980: Jagannath Pahadia, Indian National Congress
1984: Lala Ram Ken, Indian National Congress
1989: Than Singh Jatav, Bharatiya Janata Party
1991: Ganga Ram Koli, Bharatiya Janata Party
1996: Ganga Ram Koli, Bharatiya Janata Party
1998: Ganga Ram Koli, Bharatiya Janata Party
1999: Bahadur Singh Koli, Bharatiya Janata Party
2004: Ramswaroop Koli, Bharatiya Janata Party
2008 onwards:Constituency does not exist

Election results

2004

See also
 Bharatpur district
 List of Constituencies of the Lok Sabha

References

Former Lok Sabha constituencies of Rajasthan
Former constituencies of the Lok Sabha
2008 disestablishments in India
Constituencies disestablished in 2008